The 2013–14 Gibraltar Cup is the inaugural prize of the Gibraltar Premier Cup, a competition for the teams in the Gibraltar Premier Division, the top tier of football in Gibraltar.

Results

Group A

Group B

Semifinals
Semifinals played on 1 February 2014

Final
The final was played on 22 February 2014

References

External links
 Gibraltar League Cup at soccerway.com

League Cup Gibraltar
League Cup
Football competitions in Gibraltar